Ichalkaranji Assembly constituency is one of the 288 Vidhan Sabha (legislative assembly) constituencies of Maharashtra state, western India. This constituency is located in Kolhapur district.

Geographical scope
The constituency comprises Ichalkaranji revenue circle and Ichalkaranji Municipal Council belonging to Hatkanangale taluka.

Members of Vidhan Sabha

References

Assembly constituencies of Kolhapur district
Ichalkaranji
Assembly constituencies of Maharashtra